Saint Charles may refer to:

People

 Charles I, Count of Flanders (1084–1127), Blessed Charles the Good, count of Flanders, 1119–1127
 Charles, Duke of Brittany (1319–1364), Blessed Charles de Châtillon
 Saint Charles Borromeo (1538–1584), cardinal and archbishop of Milan, 1564–1584
 Blessed Charles Spinola (1564–1622), Italian Jesuit missionary martyred in Japan
 King Charles the Martyr (1600–1649), Anglican martyr, king of England, Scotland, and Ireland, 1625–1649
Saint Charles Garnier (missionary) (1606–1649), French Jesuit missionary martyred in Canada
 Saint Charles of Sezze (1613–1670), Italian friar of the Franciscan Order
 Saint Charles-Joseph-Eugène de Mazenod (1782–1861), French Catholic clergyman
 Saint Charles of Mount Argus (1821–1893), Dutch Passionist priest who worked in Ireland
 Saint Charles Lwanga (1860 or 1865–1886), Ugandan Catholic martyr

Places

Barbados
 Port Saint Charles, luxury marina within the parish of Saint Peter

Canada
 Saint-Charles Parish, New Brunswick
 Saint-Charles, New Brunswick, an unincorporated community
 St. Charles, Ontario, town in the Sudbury District
 St. Charles, Winnipeg, city ward of Winnipeg, Manitoba
 Saint-Charles-Borromée, Quebec, city in the region of Lanaudière
 Saint-Charles-sur-Richelieu, Quebec, municipality in La Vallée-du-Richelieu Regional County Municipality
 Pointe-Saint-Charles, neighborhood in Le Sud-Ouest, Montreal, Quebec

France
 Saint-Charles-de-Percy, merged into Valdallière commune in Calvados department, Normandy region
 Marseille-Saint-Charles Station, main railway station and intercity bus station, Marseille, Bouches-du-Rhône

United States
 St. Charles, Arkansas, town in Arkansas County
 Saint Charles Reservoir, in Pueblo County, Colorado
 Saint Charles River, in Colorado
 Saint Charles, Georgia
 St. Charles, Idaho, city in Bear Lake County
 St. Charles, Illinois, city in DuPage and Kane counties
 St. Charles, Iowa, city in Madison County
 St. Charles, Kentucky, city in Hopkins County
 St. Charles Parish, Louisiana, parish in New Orleans metropolitan area
 St. Charles, Maryland, planned community in Charles County
 St. Charles, Michigan, village in Saginaw County
 St. Charles, Minnesota, city in Winona County
 St. Charles County, Missouri, county in eastern Missouri
 St. Charles, Missouri, city and county seat
 Saint Charles, Ohio, unincorporated community in Butler County
 St. Charles, South Carolina, census-designated place in Lee County
 St. Charles, South Dakota, census-designated place in Gregory County
 St. Charles, Virginia, town in Lee County

Education
 Saint Charles Preparatory School, Catholic high school in Columbus, Ohio, United States
 St. Charles Parish Public School System, public school district headquartered in Luling, Louisiana
 St. Charles Borromeo School, private catholic school in Destrehan, Louisiana
 St. Charles Borromeo High School, former private high school in Destrehan, Louisiana
 St. Charles Catholic High School (Laplace, Louisiana), private high school in the Archdiocese of New Orleans
 St. Charles Community Schools, school district in St. Charles, Michigan
 St. Charles East High School, public high school in St. Charles, Illinois
 St. Charles Garnier College, private secondary school in Quebec City, Quebec
 St Charles' Primary School, primary school in Newton, Scotland

Transportation
 St. Charles (ship), screw-driven steamboat on the upper Peace River, Canada, 1903–1916
 St. Charles Streetcar Line, Louisiana, U.S.

Other uses
 St. Charles Avenue, Louisiana, U.S.
 Place St. Charles, skyscraper
 St. Charles Parkway, Maryland, U.S.

See also
 St. Charles' Church (disambiguation)
 St. Charles College (disambiguation)
 St. Charles High School (disambiguation)
 St. Charles Township (disambiguation)
 Charles Borromeo Church (disambiguation)
 Saint Charles Borromeo Seminary (disambiguation)
 San Carlo (disambiguation)
 San Carlos (disambiguation)
 Karlskirche (disambiguation)